Cardiomyopathy is a group of diseases that affect the heart muscle. Early on there may be few or no symptoms. As the disease worsens, shortness of breath, feeling tired, and  swelling of the legs may occur, due to the onset of heart failure. An irregular heart beat and fainting may occur. Those affected are at an increased risk of sudden cardiac death.

Types of cardiomyopathy include hypertrophic cardiomyopathy, dilated cardiomyopathy, restrictive cardiomyopathy, arrhythmogenic right ventricular dysplasia, and Takotsubo cardiomyopathy (broken heart syndrome). In hypertrophic cardiomyopathy the heart muscle enlarges and thickens. In dilated cardiomyopathy the ventricles enlarge and weaken. In restrictive cardiomyopathy the ventricle stiffens.

In many cases, the cause cannot be determined. Hypertrophic cardiomyopathy is usually inherited, whereas dilated cardiomyopathy is inherited in about one third of cases. Dilated cardiomyopathy may also result from alcohol, heavy metals, coronary artery disease, cocaine use, and viral infections. Restrictive cardiomyopathy may be caused by amyloidosis, hemochromatosis, and some cancer treatments. Broken heart syndrome is caused by extreme emotional or physical stress.

Treatment depends on the type of cardiomyopathy and the severity of symptoms. Treatments may include lifestyle changes, medications, or surgery. Surgery may include a ventricular assist device or heart transplant. In 2015 cardiomyopathy and myocarditis affected 2.5 million people. Hypertrophic cardiomyopathy affects about 1 in 500 people while dilated cardiomyopathy affects 1 in 2,500. They resulted in 354,000 deaths up from 294,000 in 1990. Arrhythmogenic right ventricular dysplasia is more common in young people.

Signs and symptoms

Symptoms of cardiomyopathies may include fatigue, swelling of the lower extremities and shortness of breath after exertion. Additional symptoms of the condition may include arrhythmia, fainting, and dizziness.

Causes

Cardiomyopathies can be of genetic (familial) or non-genetic (acquired) origin. Genetic cardiomyopathies usually are caused by sarcomere or cytoskeletal diseases, neuromuscular disorders, inborn errors of metabolism, malformation syndromes and sometimes are unidentified. Non-genetic cardiomyopathies can have a definitive causes such as viral infections, myocarditis and others.

Cardiomyopathies are either confined to the heart or are part of a generalized systemic disorder, both often leading to cardiovascular death or progressive heart failure-related disability. Other diseases that cause heart muscle dysfunction are excluded, such as coronary artery disease, hypertension, or abnormalities of the heart valves. Often, the underlying cause remains unknown, but in many cases the cause may be identifiable. Alcoholism, for example, has been identified as a cause of dilated cardiomyopathy, as has drug toxicity, and certain infections (including Hepatitis C). Untreated celiac disease can cause cardiomyopathies, which can completely reverse with a timely diagnosis. In addition to acquired causes, molecular biology and genetics have given rise to the recognition of various genetic causes.

A more clinical categorization of cardiomyopathy as 'hypertrophied', 'dilated', or 'restrictive', has become difficult to maintain because some of the conditions could fulfill more than one of those three categories at any particular stage of their development.

The current American Heart Association (AHA) definition divides cardiomyopathies into primary, which affect the heart alone, and secondary, which are the result of illness affecting other parts of the body. These categories are further broken down into subgroups which incorporate new genetic and molecular biology knowledge.

Mechanism
The pathophysiology of cardiomyopathies is better understood at the cellular level with advances in molecular techniques. Mutant proteins can disturb cardiac function in the contractile apparatus (or mechanosensitive complexes). Cardiomyocyte alterations and their persistent responses at the cellular level cause changes that are correlated with sudden cardiac death and other cardiac problems.

Cardiomyopathies are generally varied individually. Different factors can cause Cardiomyopathies in adults as well as children. To exemplify, Dilated Cardiomyopathy in adults is associated with Ischemic Cardiomyopathy, Hypertension, Valvular diseases, and Genetics. While in Children, Neuromuscular diseases such as Becker muscular dystrophy, including X-linked genetic disorder, are directly linked with their Cardiomyopathies.

Diagnosis

Among the diagnostic procedures done to determine a cardiomyopathy are:
 Physical exam
 Family history
 Blood test
 ECG
 Echocardiogram
 Stress test
 Genetic testing

Classification

Cardiomyopathies can be classified using different criteria:
 Primary/intrinsic cardiomyopathies
 Congenital
 Hypertrophic cardiomyopathy (HCM)
 Arrhythmogenic right ventricular cardiomyopathy (ARVC)
 Left ventricular noncompaction
 Ion Channelopathies like the Long QT syndrome and the very rare Short QT syndrome
 Catecholaminergic polymorphic ventricular tachycardia
 Mixed
 Dilated cardiomyopathy (DCM)
 Restrictive cardiomyopathy (RCM)
 Brugada syndrome
 Acquired
 Stress cardiomyopathy
 Myocarditis, inflammation of and injury to heart tissue due in part to its infiltration by lymphocytes and monocytes
 Eosinophilic myocarditis, inflammation of and injury to heart tissue due in part to its infiltration by eosinophils
 Ischemic cardiomyopathy (not formally included in the classification, due to ischemic cardiomyopathy being a direct result of another cardiac problem)
 Secondary/extrinsic cardiomyopathies
 Metabolic/storage
 Fabry's disease
 Hemochromatosis
 Endomyocardial
 Endomyocardial fibrosis
 Hypereosinophilic syndrome
 Endocrine
 Diabetes mellitus
 Hyperthyroidism
 Acromegaly
 Cardiofacial
 Noonan syndrome
 Neuromuscular
 Muscular dystrophy
 Friedreich's ataxia
 Other
 Obesity-associated cardiomyopathy

Treatment
Treatment may include suggestion of lifestyle changes to better manage the condition. Treatment depends on the type of cardiomyopathy and condition of disease, but may include medication (conservative treatment) or iatrogenic/implanted pacemakers for slow heart rates, defibrillators for those prone to fatal heart rhythms, ventricular assist devices (VADs) for severe heart failure, or catheter ablation for recurring dysrhythmias that cannot be eliminated by medication or mechanical cardioversion. The goal of treatment is often symptom relief, and some patients may eventually require a heart transplant.

See also
 Myopathy, a condition affecting skeletal muscles
 Fibrosing cardiomyopathy, a disease in great apes
Basic Research in Cardiology

References

Further reading

External links 
 

 
Wikipedia medicine articles ready to translate
Wikipedia emergency medicine articles ready to translate